Leon De Lathouwer (19 September 1929 – 7 August 2008) was a Belgian road cyclist. He won a gold medal in the team road race at the 1948 Summer Olympics in London, together with Lode Wouters and Eugène Van Roosbroeck, and placed fourth in individual road race. The same year he won the Tour of Belgium as amateur. In the early 1950s he turned professional and won several local races before retiring in 1959. He was the Flemish champion in 1948, 1949, 1953 and 1955.

References

External links
 

1929 births
2008 deaths
People from Wetteren
Belgian male cyclists
Cyclists at the 1948 Summer Olympics
Olympic cyclists of Belgium
Olympic gold medalists for Belgium
Olympic medalists in cycling
Medalists at the 1948 Summer Olympics
Cyclists from East Flanders